The Rivers and Harbors Appropriation Act of 1899 is the oldest federal environmental law in the United States. The Act makes it a misdemeanor to discharge refuse matter of any kind into the navigable waters, or tributaries thereof, of the United States without a permit; this specific provision is known as the Refuse Act. The Act also makes it a misdemeanor to excavate, fill, or alter the course, condition, or capacity of any port, harbor, channel, or other areas within the reach of the Act without a permit.  The Act also made it illegal to dam navigable streams without a license (or permit) from Congress. This provision was included for the purposes of hydroelectric generation, at a time when the electric utility industry was expanding rapidly.

Although many activities covered by the Act are regulated under the Clean Water Act, the 1899 Act retains independent vitality. The Act is administered by the United States Army Corps of Engineers. However, authority to administer Section 9 of the Act, applying to bridges and causeways in, over or on navigable waters of the U.S. (superseded by the General Bridge Act of 1946, as amended), was removed from the Corps of Engineers and redelegated to the U.S. Coast Guard under the provisions of the Department of Transportation Act of 1966. The Corps owns and operates many bridges and may not regulate themselves due to conflict of interest.

The Jacksonville District of the Army Corps of Engineers has jurisdiction over the waters of the Caribbean Sea, the Gulf of Mexico and the Atlantic Ocean.

See also
Clean Water Act#Dredge and fill permits
Flood Control Act
Water pollution
Water Resources Development Act

References

 

1899 in the environment
1899 in American law
United States federal admiralty and maritime legislation
United States federal environmental legislation
United States federal public land legislation
Water law in the United States
United States federal appropriations legislation